Theoretical and Mathematical Physics (Russian: Теоретическая и Математическая Физика) is a Russian scientific journal. It was founded in 1969 by Nikolai Bogolubov. Currently handled by the Russian Academy of Sciences, it appears in 12 issues per year. The journal publishes papers on
mathematical aspects of quantum mechanics, quantum field theory, statistical physics, supersymmetry, and integrable models  (in any areas of physics).

The editor-in-chief is Dmitri I. Kazakov (Institute for Nuclear Research). According to the Journal Citation Reports, the journal has a 2021 impact factor of 0.685.

References

External links

 Access to the publications
 Russian version of the Journal

Physics journals
Russian Academy of Sciences academic journals